Börje Tapper (19 May 1922 – 8 April 1981) was a Swedish footballer who played as a midfielder for Malmö FF, Genoa, and the Sweden national team. He won four caps for Sweden and was a squad member at the 1950 FIFA World Cup.

Career
Tapper started his playing career at Håkanstorp before moving on to Malmö FF. He played for the club between 1939 and 1950, when he went to Italy and Genoa. He did not succeed in Italy and when he came home to Sweden, he was not allowed to play in Allsvenskan anymore due to the policy at the time. He is Malmö FF's second best goalscorer ever with 298 goals.

He later coached Lunds BK.

Personal life 
He is the father of Staffan Tapper.

Career statistics

International 

 Scores and results list Sweden's goal tally first, score column indicates score after each Tapper goal.

References 

1922 births
1981 deaths
Swedish footballers
Sweden international footballers
Swedish expatriate footballers
Malmö FF players
Allsvenskan players
1950 FIFA World Cup players
Swedish football managers
Lunds BK managers
Genoa C.F.C. players
Serie A players
Expatriate footballers in Italy
Association football midfielders
Footballers from Malmö